Gilsoddeum is a 1986 South Korean drama film directed by Im Kwon-taek. It was entered into the 36th Berlin International Film Festival.

Plot
In 1983 KBS launched a campaign to reunite families torn apart in the Korean War three decades earlier. In an expert dissection of the social and familial rifts in modern Korea, director Im Kwon-taek integrates footage from the campaign into the story of Hwa-yeong, who leaves her middle-class life in Busan to search for the son she lost in Gilsotteum during the war.

Cast
 Kim Ji-mee as Hwa-yeong
 Shin Seong-il as Dong-jin
 Han Ji-il
 Kim Ji-young
 Lee Sang-a

Production
In this film Lee Sang-a has brief love scenes and a full rear nude shot. The actress, who was 13 or 14 years old during filming, revealed in 2015 that she was forced to do the nude scene by director Im Kwon-taek.

References

External links

1986 films
1980s Korean-language films
1986 drama films
Films directed by Im Kwon-taek
South Korean drama films
Grand Prize Paeksang Arts Award (Film) winners